The  is a  spur route of the Dō-Ō Expressway in Kuromatsunai, Hokkaido. It is owned and operated by Ministry of Land, Infrastructure, Transport and Tourism and is numbered E5A under their "2016 Proposal for Realization of Expressway Numbering".

Route description

The Kuromatsunai Shindō begins at, Kuromatsunai Junction, an interchange with the Dō-Ō Expressway in eastern Kuromatsunai. Once the expressway begins, tolls are collected by the East Nippon Expressway Company for the distance traveled along the Dō-Ō Expressway. The remainder of the Kuromatsunai Shindō is free to travel on. After passing through the toll booth a partial interchange allows access only from Hokkaido Route 344 to the westbound traffic of the Kuromatsunai Shindō and access from the expressway to Route 344. The expressway parallels the local route traveling northwest towards central Kuromatsunai. The expressway comes to an end at an at-grade junction with National Route 5.

History
The Kuromatsunai Shindō opened on 7 November 2009.

Junction list
The route lies entirely within Hokkaido.

See also

References

External links

Expressways in Japan
Roads in Hokkaido